Broadcast Film Critics Association Awards 1997 may refer to:

 2nd Critics' Choice Awards, the second Critics' Choice Awards ceremony that took place in 1997
 3rd Critics' Choice Awards, the third Critics' Choice Awards ceremony that took place in 1998 and which honored the best in film for 1997